The United States Deputy Secretary of the Treasury, in the United States government, advises and assists the Secretary of the Treasury in the supervision and direction of the Department of the Treasury and its activities, and succeeds the Secretary in the secretary's absence, sickness, or unavailability. The Deputy Secretary plays a primary role in the formulation and execution of Treasury policies and programs in all aspects of the Department's activities.
In addition, the Deputy Secretary is the only official other than the secretary who can sign a Treasury order, which is a document that delegates authority residing in the secretary or Deputy Secretary to another Treasury official, establishes Treasury policy, and establishes the reporting relationships and supervision of officials. Former deputy secretaries include Roger Altman, Lawrence Summers, Stuart E. Eizenstat, Kenneth W. Dam, and Samuel Bodman.

The office of Deputy Secretary is the successor of the "Under Secretary of the Treasury", the former chief deputy to the secretary. Today, several officials hold the title of "Under Secretary" of the Treasury. Among those who served as under secretary when it was the number-two position in the department include Dean Acheson, Henry Morgenthau Jr., John W. Hanes II, and O. Max Gardner (1946–1947).

The prior Deputy Secretary was Justin Muzinich.  President Donald Trump announced his nomination of Muzinich on March 13, 2018. The nomination was confirmed by the U.S. Senate on a vote of 55–44.

The current Deputy Secretary is Wally Adeyemo, who is serving in the Biden administration and is the first African American Deputy Secretary of the Treasury.

List of deputy secretaries of the treasury

Status

References

Deputy Secretary
Treasury